Domun is a village in Khyber-Pakhtunkhwa. It is located at 35°44'42N 71°47'56E with an altitude of 1901 metres (6240 feet).

References

Villages in Khyber Pakhtunkhwa